Purana (literally meaning "ancient, old") is a vast genre of Indian literature about a wide range of topics, particularly about legends and other traditional lore. The Puranas are known for the intricate layers of symbolism depicted within their stories. Composed originally in Sanskrit and in other Indian languages, several of these texts are named after major Hindu gods such as Vishnu, Shiva, Brahma, and Adi Shakti. The Puranic genre of literature is found in both Hinduism and Jainism.

The Puranic literature is encyclopedic, and it includes diverse topics such as cosmogony, cosmology, genealogies of gods, goddesses, kings, heroes, sages, and demigods, folk tales, pilgrimages, temples, medicine, astronomy, grammar, mineralogy, humor, love stories, as well as theology and philosophy. The content is highly inconsistent across the Puranas, and each Purana has survived in numerous manuscripts which are themselves inconsistent. The Hindu Maha Puranas are traditionally attributed to "Vyasa", but many scholars considered them likely the work of many authors over the centuries; in contrast, most Jaina Puranas can be dated and their authors assigned.

There are 18 Mukhya Puranas (Major Puranas) and 18 Upa Puranas (Minor Puranas), with over 400,000 verses. The first versions of various Puranas were likely to have been composed between 3rd and 10th century CE. The Puranas do not enjoy the authority of a scripture in Hinduism, but are considered as Smritis.

They have been influential in the Hindu culture, inspiring major national and regional annual festivals of Hinduism. Their role and value as sectarian religious texts and historical texts has been controversial because all Puranas praise many gods and goddesses and "their sectarianism is far less clear cut" than assumed, states Ludo Rocher. The religious practices included in them are considered Vaidika (congruent with Vedic literature), because they do not preach initiation into Tantra. The Bhagavata Purana has been among the most celebrated and popular text in the Puranic genre, and is, in the opinion of some, of non-dualistic tenor. But, the dualistic school of Shriman Madhvacharya has a rich and strong tradition of dualistic interpretation of the Bhagavata, starting from the Bhagavata Taatparya Nirnaya of the Acharya himself and later, commentaries on the commentary.  The Chaitanya school also rejects outright any monistic interpretation of the purana. The Puranic literature wove with the Bhakti movement in India, and both Dvaita and Advaita scholars have commented on the underlying Vedantic themes in the Maha Puranas.

Etymology 
Douglas Harper states that the etymological origins of Puranas are from Sanskrit Puranah, literally "ancient, former," from pura "formerly, before," cognate with Greek paros "before," pro "before," Avestan paro "before," Old English fore, from Proto-Indo-European *pre-, from *per-."

Origin 

Vyasa, the narrator of the Mahabharata, is hagiographically credited as the compiler of the Puranas. The ancient tradition suggests that originally there was but one Purana. Vishnu Purana (3.6.15) mentions that Vyasa entrusted his Puranasamhita to his disciple Lomaharshana, who in turn imparted it to his disciples, three of whom compiled their own samhitas. These three, together with Lomaharshana's, comprise the Mulasamhita, from which the later eighteen Puranas were derived.

The term Purana appears in the Vedic texts. For example, Atharva Veda mentions Purana (in the singular) in XI.7.24 and XV.6.10-11:

Similarly, the Shatapatha Brahmana (XI.5.6.8) mentions Itihasapuranam (as one compound word) and recommends that on the 9th day of Pariplava, the hotr priest should narrate some Purana because "the Purana is the Veda, this it is" (XIII.4.3.13). However, states P.V. Kane, it is not certain whether these texts suggested several works or single work with the term Purana. The late Vedic text Taittiriya Aranyaka (II.10) uses the term in the plural. Therefore, states Kane, that in the later Vedic period at least, the Puranas referred to three or more texts, and that they were studied and recited. In numerous passages the Mahabharata mentions 'Purana' in both singular and plural forms. Moreover, it is not unlikely that, where the singular 'Puranam' was employed in the texts, a class of works was meant. Further, despite the mention of the term Purana or Puranas in the Vedic texts, there is uncertainty about the contents of them until the composition of the oldest Dharmashastra Apastamba Dharmasutra and Gautama Dharmasutra, that mention Puranas resembling with the extant Puranas.

Another early mention of the term 'Itihas-purana' is found in the Chandogya Upanishad (7.1.2), translated by Patrick Olivelle as "the corpus of histories and ancient tales as the fifth Veda". The Brhadaranyaka Upanishad also refers to purana as the "fifth Veda".

According to Thomas Coburn, Puranas and early extra-puranic texts attest to two traditions regarding their origin, one proclaiming a divine origin as the breath of the Great Being, the other as a human named Vyasa as the arranger of already existing material into eighteen Puranas. In the early references, states Coburn, the term Purana occurs in singular unlike the later era which refers to a plural form presumably because they had assumed their "multifarious form".

According to the Indologists J. A. B. van Buitenen and Cornelia Dimmitt, the Puranas that have survived into the modern era are ancient but represent "an amalgam of two somewhat different but never entirely different separate oral literatures: the Brahmin tradition stemming from the reciters of the Vedas, and the bardic poetry recited by Sutas that was handed down in Kshatriya circles". The original Puranas comes from the priestly roots while the later genealogies have the warrior and epic roots. These texts were collected for the "second time between the fourth and sixth centuries CE under the rule of the Gupta kings", a period of Hindu renaissance. However, the editing and expansion of the Puranas did not stop after the Gupta era, and the texts continued to "grow for another five hundred or a thousand years" and these were preserved by priests who maintained Hindu pilgrimage sites and temples. The core of Itihasa-Puranas, states Klaus Klostermaier, may possibly go back to the seventh century BCE or even earlier.

It is not possible to set a specific date for any Purana as a whole, states Ludo Rocher. He points out that even
for the better established and more coherent puranas such as Bhagavata and Vishnu, the dates proposed by scholars continue to vary widely and endlessly. The date of the production of the written texts does not define the date of origin of the Puranas. They existed in an oral form before being written down. In the 19th century, F. E. Pargiter believed the "original Purana" may date to the time of the final redaction of the Vedas. Wendy Doniger, based on her study of indologists, assigns approximate dates to the various Puranas. She dates Markandeya Purana to c. 250 CE (with one portion dated to c. 550 CE), Matsya Purana to c. 250–500 CE, Vayu Purana to c. 350 CE, Harivamsa and Vishnu Purana to c. 450 CE, Brahmanda Purana to c. 350–950 CE, Vamana Purana to c. 450–900 CE, Kurma Purana to c. 550–850 CE, and Linga Purana to c. 600–1000 CE.

Texts

Mahapuranas 
Of the many texts designated 'Puranas' the most important are the s or the major Puranas. These are said to be eighteen in number, divided into three groups of six, though they are not always counted in the same way.In the Vishnu Purana Part 3 Section 6(21-24) the list of Mahapuranas is mentioned. The Bhagavat Purana mentions the number of verses in each Purana in 12.13(4-9).

In Shiva Purana – Uma Samhita mentioned following list of Mahapuranas:

In Devi Bhagavata the Vayu Purana is mentioned instead of the Shiva Purana. The Mahapuranas have also been classified based on a specific deity, although the texts are mixed and revere all gods and goddesses:

All major Puranas contain sections on Devi (goddesses) and Tantra; the six most significant of these are: Markandeya Purana, Shiva Purana, Linga Purana, Brahma Vaivarta Purana, Agni Purana and Padma Purana.

Upapurana 

The difference between Upapuranas and Mahapuranas has been explained by Rajendra Hazra as, "a Mahapurana is well known, and that what is less well known becomes an Upapurana". Rocher states that the distinction between Mahapurana and Upapurana is ahistorical, there is little corroborating evidence that either were more or less known, and that "the term Mahapurana occurs rarely in Purana literature, and is probably of late origin."

The Upapuranas are eighteen in number, with disagreement as to which canonical titles belong in that list of eighteen.

They include among –

 Sanat-kumara
 Narasimha
 Brihan-naradiya
 Siva-rahasya
 Durvasa
 Kapila
 Vamana
 Bhargava
 Varuna
 Kalika
 Samba
 Nandi
 Surya
 Parasara
 Vasishtha
 Ganesha
 Mudgala
 Hamsa

With only a few having been critically edited.

The Ganesha and Mudgala Puranas are devoted to Ganesha.

Skanda Purana 
The Skanda Purana is the largest Purana with 81,000 verses, named after deity Skanda, the son of Shiva and Uma, and brother of deity Ganesha. The mythological part of the text weaves the stories of Shiva and Vishnu, along with Parvati, Rama, Krishna and other major gods in the Hindu pantheon. In Chapter 1.8, it declares,

The Skanda Purana has received renewed scholarly interest ever since the late 20th-century discovery of a Nepalese Skanda Purana manuscript dated to be from the early 9th century. This discovery established that Skanda Purana existed by the 9th century. However, a comparison shows that the 9th-century document is entirely different from versions of Skanda Purana that have been circulating in South Asia since the colonial era.

Content 

Several Puranas, such as the Matsya Purana, Devi Bhagavata Purana list "five characteristics" or "five signs" of a Purana. These are called the Pancha Lakshana, and are topics covered by a Purana:
Sarga: cosmogony or the creation of the world
Pratisarga: cosmogony and cosmology
Vamśa: genealogy of the gods, sages and kings
Manvañtara: cosmic cycles, history of the world during the time of one patriarch
Vamśānucaritam: Account of royal dynasties dynasty, including the Suryavamshi and Chandravamshi kings

A few Puranas, such as the most popular Bhagavata Purana, add five more characteristics to expand this list to ten:
Utaya: karmic links between the deities, sages, kings and the various living beings
Ishanukatha: tales about a god
Nirodha: finale, cessation
Mukti: moksha, spiritual liberation
Ashraya: refuge

These five or ten sections weave in biographies, myths, geography, medicine, astronomy, Hindu temples, pilgrimage to distant real places, rites of passage, charity, ethics, duties, rights, dharma, divine intervention in cosmic and human affairs, love stories, festivals, theosophy and philosophy. The Puranas link gods to men, both generally and in religious bhakti context. Here the Puranic literature follows a general pattern. It starts with introduction, a future devotee is described as ignorant about the god yet curious, the devotee learns about the god and this begins the spiritual realization, the text then describes instances of God's grace which begins to persuade and convert the devotee, the devotee then shows devotion which is rewarded by the god, the reward is appreciated by the devotee and in return performs actions to express further devotion.

The Puranas, states Flood, document the rise of the theistic traditions such as those based on Vishnu, Shiva and the goddess Devi and include respective mythology, pilgrimage to holy places, rituals and genealogies. The bulk of these texts in Flood's view were established by 500 CE, in the Gupta era though amendments were made later. Along with inconsistencies, common ideas are found throughout the corpus but it is not possible to trace the lines of influence of one Purana upon another so the corpus is best viewed as a synchronous whole. An example of similar stories woven across the Puranas, but in different versions, include the lingabhava – the "apparition of the linga". The story features Brahma, Vishnu, and Shiva, the three major deities of Hinduism, who get together, debate, and after various versions of the story, in the end the glory of Shiva is established by the apparition of linga. This story, state Bonnefoy, and Doniger, appears in Vayu Purana 1.55, Brahmanda Purana 1.26, Shiva Purana's Rudra Samhita Sristi Khanda 15, Skanda Purana's chapters 1.3, 1.16 and 3.1, and other Puranas.

The texts are in Sanskrit as well as regional languages, and almost entirely in narrative metric couplets.

Symbolism and layers of meaning 
The texts use ideas, concepts and even names that are symbolic. The words can interpreted literally, and at an axiological level. The Vishnu Purana, for example, recites a myth where the names of the characters are loaded with symbolism and axiological significance. The myth is as follows,

Puranas as a complement to the Vedas 

The relation of the Puranas with Vedas has been debated by scholars, some holding that there's no relationship, others contending that they are identical. The Puranic literature, stated Max Muller, is independent, has changed often over its history, and has little relation to the Vedic age or the Vedic literature. In contrast, Purana literature is evidently intended to serve as a complement to the Vedas, states Vans Kennedy.

Some scholars such as Govinda Das suggest that the Puranas claim a link to the Vedas but in name only, not in substance. The link is purely a mechanical one. Scholars such as Viman Chandra Bhattacharya and PV Kane state that the Puranas are a continuation and development of the Vedas. Sudhakar Malaviya and VG Rahurkar state the connection is closer in that the Puranas are companion texts to help understand and interpret the Vedas. K.S. Ramaswami Sastri and Manilal N. Dvivedi reflect the third view which states that Puranas enable us to know the "true import of the ethos, philosophy, and religion of the Vedas".

Barbara Holdrege questions the fifth Veda status of Itihasas (the Hindu epics) and Puranas. The Puranas, states V.S. Agrawala, intend to "explicate, interpret, adapt" the metaphysical truths in the Vedas. In the general opinion, states Rocher, "the Puranas cannot be divorced from the Vedas" though scholars provide different interpretations of the link between the two.  Scholars have given the Bhagavata Purana as an example of the links and continuity of the Vedic content such as providing an interpretation of the Gayatri mantra.

Puranas as encyclopedias 
The Puranas, states Kees Bolle, are best seen as "vast, often encyclopedic" works from ancient and medieval India. Some of them, such as the Agni Purana and Matsya Purana, cover all sorts of subjects, dealing with – states Rocher – "anything and everything", from fiction to facts, from practical recipes to abstract philosophy, from geographic Mahatmyas (travel guides) to cosmetics, from festivals to astronomy. Like encyclopedias, they were updated to remain current with their times, by a process called Upabrimhana. However, some of the 36 major and minor Puranas are more focused handbooks, such as the Skanda Purana, Padma Purana and Bhavishya Purana which deal primarily with Tirtha Mahatmyas (pilgrimage travel guides), while Vayu Purana and Brahmanda Purana focus more on history, mythology and legends.

Puranas as religious texts 
The colonial era scholars of Puranas studied them primarily as religious texts, with Vans Kennedy declaring in 1837, that any other use of these documents would be disappointing. John Zephaniah Holwell, who from 1732 onwards spent 30 years in India and was elected Fellow of the Royal Society in 1767, described the Puranas as "18 books of divine words". British officials and researchers such as Holwell, states Urs App, were orientalist scholars who introduced a distorted picture of Indian literature and Puranas as "sacred scriptures of India" in 1767. Holwell, states Urs App, "presented it as the opinion of knowledgeable Indians; But it is abundantly clear that no knowledgeable Indian would ever have said anything remotely similar".

Modern scholarship doubts this 19th-century premise. Ludo Rocher, for example, states,

The study of Puranas as a religious text remains a controversial subject. Some Indologists, in colonial tradition of scholarship, treat the Puranic texts as scriptures or useful source of religious contents. Other scholars, such as Ronald Inden, consider this approach "essentialist and antihistorical" because the Purana texts changed often over time and over distance, and the underlying presumption of they being religious texts is that those changes are "Hinduism expressed by a religious leader or philosopher", or "expressiveness of Hindu mind", or "society at large", when the texts and passages are literary works and "individual geniuses of their authors".

Jainism 

The Jaina Puranas are like Hindu Puranas encyclopedic epics in style, and are considered as anuyogas (expositions), but they are not considered Jain Agamas and do not have scripture or quasi-canonical status in Jainism tradition. They are best described, states John Cort, as post-scripture literary corpus based upon themes found in Jain scriptures.

Sectarian, pluralistic or monotheistic theme 
Scholars have debated whether the Puranas should be categorized as sectarian, or non-partisan, or monotheistic religious texts. Different Puranas describe a number of stories where Brahma, Vishnu, and Shiva compete for supremacy. In some Puranas, such as Srimad Devi Bhagavatam, the Goddess Devi joins the competition and ascends for the position of being Supreme. Further, most Puranas emphasize legends around one who is either Shiva, or Vishnu, or Devi. The texts thus appear to be sectarian. However, states Edwin Bryant, while these legends sometimes appear to be partisan, they are merely acknowledging the obvious question of whether one or the other is more important, more powerful. In the final analysis, all Puranas weave their legends to celebrate pluralism, and accept the other two and all gods in Hindu pantheon as personalized form but equivalent essence of the Ultimate Reality called Brahman. The Puranas are not spiritually partisan, states Bryant, but "accept and indeed extol the transcendent and absolute nature of the other, and of the Goddess Devi too".

Ludo Rocher, in his review of Puranas as sectarian texts, states, "even though the Puranas contain sectarian materials, their sectarianism should not be interpreted as exclusivism in favor of one god to the detriment of all others".

Puranas as historical texts 
Despite the diversity and wealth of manuscripts from ancient and medieval India that have survived into the modern times, there is a paucity of historical data in them. Neither the author name nor the year of their composition were recorded or preserved, over the centuries, as the documents were copied from one generation to another. This paucity tempted 19th-century scholars to use the Puranas as a source of chronological and historical information about India or Hinduism. This effort was, after some effort, either summarily rejected by some scholars, or become controversial, because the Puranas include fables and fiction, and the information within and across the Puranas was found to be inconsistent.

In early 20th-century, some regional records were found to be more consistent, such as for the Hindu dynasties in Telangana, Andhra Pradesh. Basham, as well as Kosambi, have questioned whether lack of inconsistency is sufficient proof of reliability and historicity. More recent scholarship has attempted to, with limited success, states Ludo Rocher, use the Puranas for historical information in combination with independent corroborating evidence, such as "epigraphy, archaeology, Buddhist literature, Jaina literature, non-Puranic literature, Islamic records, and records preserved outside India by travelers to or from India in medieval times such as in China, Myanmar and Indonesia".

Manuscripts 

The study of Puranas manuscripts has been challenging because they are highly inconsistent. This is true for all Mahapuranas and Upapuranas. Most editions of Puranas, in use particularly by Western scholars, are "based on one manuscript or on a few manuscripts selected at random", even though divergent manuscripts with the same title exist. Scholars have long acknowledged the existence of Purana manuscripts that "seem to differ much from the printed edition", and it is unclear which one is accurate, and whether conclusions drawn from the randomly or cherrypicked printed version were universal over geography or time. This problem is most severe with Purana manuscripts of the same title, but in regional languages such as Tamil, Telugu, Bengali, and others which have largely been ignored.

Chronology 
Newly discovered Puranas manuscripts from the medieval centuries have attracted scholarly attention and the conclusion that the Puranic literature has gone through slow redaction and text corruption over time, as well as sudden deletion of numerous chapters and its replacement with new content to an extent that the currently circulating Puranas are entirely different from those that existed before 11th century, or 16th century.

For example, a newly discovered palm-leaf manuscript of Skanda Purana in Nepal has been dated to be from 810 CE but is entirely different from versions of Skanda Purana that have been circulating in South Asia since the colonial era. Further discoveries of four more manuscripts, each different, suggest that document has gone through major redactions twice, first likely before the 12th century, and the second very large change sometime in the 15th-16th century for unknown reasons. The different versions of manuscripts of Skanda Purana suggest that "minor" redactions, interpolations, and corruption of the ideas in the text over time.

Rocher states that the date of the composition of each Purana remains a contested issue. Dimmitt and van Buitenen state that each of the Puranas manuscripts is encyclopedic in style, and it is difficult to ascertain when, where, why and by whom these were written:

Forgeries 
Many of the extant manuscripts were written on palm leaf or copied during the British India colonial era, some in the 19th century. The scholarship on various Puranas, has suffered from frequent forgeries, states Ludo Rocher, where liberties in the transmission of Puranas were normal and those who copied older manuscripts replaced words or added new content to fit the theory that the colonial scholars were keen on publishing.

Translations 
Horace Hayman Wilson published one of the earliest English translations of one version of the Vishnu Purana in 1840. The same manuscript, and Wilson's translation, was reinterpreted by Manmatha Nath Dutt and published in 1896. The All India Kashiraj Trust has published editions of the Puranas.

Marinas Poullé (Mariyadas Pillai) published a French translation from a Tamil version of the Bhagavata Purana in 1788, and this was widely distributed in Europe becoming an introduction to the 18th-century Hindu culture and Hinduism to many Europeans during the colonial era. Poullé republished a different translation of the same text as Le Bhagavata in 1795, from Pondicherry. A copy of Poullé translation is preserved in Bibliothèque nationale de France, Paris.

Influence 

The most significant influence of the Puranas genre of Indian literature has been stated scholars and particularly Indian scholars, in "culture synthesis", in weaving and integrating the diverse beliefs from ritualistic rites of passage to Vedantic philosophy, from fictional legends to factual history, from individual introspective yoga to social celebratory festivals, from temples to pilgrimage, from one god to another, from goddesses to tantra, from the old to the new. These have been dynamic open texts, composed socially, over time. This, states Greg Bailey, may have allowed the Hindu culture to "preserve the old while constantly coming to terms with the new", and "if they are anything, they are records of cultural adaptation and transformation" over the last 2,000 years.

The Puranic literature, suggests Khanna, influenced "acculturation and accommodation" of a diversity of people, with different languages and from different economic classes, across different kingdoms and traditions, catalyzing the syncretic "cultural mosaic of Hinduism". They helped influence cultural pluralism in India and are a literary record thereof.

Om Prakash states the Puranas served as an efficient medium for cultural exchange and popular education in ancient and medieval India. These texts adopted, explained, and integrated regional deities such as Pashupata in Vayu Purana, Sattva in Vishnu Purana, Dattatreya in Markendeya Purana, Bhojakas in Bhavishya Purana. Further, states Prakash, they dedicated chapters to "secular subjects such as poetics, dramaturgy, grammar, lexicography, astronomy, war, politics, architecture, geography and medicine as in Agni Purana, perfumery and lapidary arts in Garuda Purana, painting, sculpture and other arts in Vishnudharmottara Purana".

 Indian Arts
The cultural influence of the Puranas extended to Indian classical arts, such as songs, dance culture such as Bharata Natyam in south India and Rasa Lila in northeast India, plays and recitations.

 Festivals
The myths, lunar calendar schedule, rituals, and celebrations of major Hindu cultural festivities such as Holi, Diwali and Durga Puja are in the Puranic literature.

Notes

References

Citations

Cited sources 

 
 
 
 
 
 
 
 
 
 
 
 
 

  First edition

Further reading

External links 

GRETIL (uni-goettingen.de)

Translations 

Agni Purana (in English), Volume 2, MN Dutt (Translator), Hathi Trust Archives
Vishnu Purana H.H. Wilson
Vishnu Purana, MN Dutt
Brahmanda Purana, GV Tagare

 
Hindu texts
Indian chronicles